Burdur Archaeological Museum is an archaeological museum in Burdur, Turkey. The museum, formally established in 1969, had a collection of 52,941 objects as of 1997. It is divided into three main areas: the Garden, the Statue Hall, and the Small Monuments Hall.

References

Archaeological museums in Turkey
Burdur